Moszczaniec  (Moshchanets’) is a village in the administrative district of Gmina Komańcza, within Sanok County, in the Subcarpathian Voivodeship (province) of south-eastern Poland, close to the border with Slovakia.

The village has a population of 250.

Since the late 1950s Moszczaniec has witnessed the construction of a large penal colony, with room for up to about 500 prisoners. Warders and other ancillary staff, including officials of the State Farm on which most of the prisoners work, are accommodated on a new housing estate in four-storeyed blocks of flats. It is a sort of garrison settlement, provisioned directly form Komancza, without a shop, a school, or public institutions on any kind. It has no church, and relatively few inhabitants attend the services in Wisłok Wielki.

See also
Komancza Republic (November 1918 – January 1919)

References

Moszczaniec